The West River is a tributary of the Connecticut River, about  long, in southern Vermont in the United States. According to the Geographic Names Information System, it has also been known historically as "Wantastiquet" and as "Waters of the Lonely Way".

The West River rises in the Green Mountains in the town of Mount Holly in southeastern Rutland County and flows southwardly through southwestern Windsor County into Windham County, where it turns southeastwardly. Along its course it flows through or along the boundaries of the towns of Weston, Londonderry, Jamaica, Townshend, Brookline, Newfane (where it collects the Rock River), and Dummerston to Brattleboro, where it flows into the Connecticut River.

U.S. Army Corps of Engineers dams on the West cause the river to form Ball Mountain Lake and Townshend Lake, both of which were built for the purpose of flood control in 1961. The river between Ball Mountain Lake and Townshend Lake is used for white water boating during releases from the Ball Mountain Dam (usually occurring during one weekend in April and one weekend in September).

See also 
 List of Vermont rivers

References

External links 
 Friends of the West River Organization working to restore traditional whitewater releases to the West River, VT.

Rivers of Vermont
Rivers of Rutland County, Vermont
Rivers of Windham County, Vermont
Rivers of Windsor County, Vermont
Tributaries of the Connecticut River